Julius Herrman Block (March 30, 1860 – September 26, 1915) was an American businessman and politician.

Biography
Block was born in Galion, Ohio and he moved with his parents to Le Sueur County, Minnesota. In 1880, Block worked as a storekeeper at the Minnesota State Hospital for the Insane in St. Peter, Minnesota. He served on the St. Peter Police Force and as the Nicollet County, Minnesota sheriff. He was a Republican. In 1883 and 1884, Block served as a corporal in the Minnesota State Militia, Company I. Block served as the Minnesota State Treasurer from 1901 to 1907. After he left office, Block was the editor of a monthly literary magazine published in Duluth, Minnesota: The Bull's Eye. Block died in Duluth, Minnesota from Bright's Disease.

Notes

1860 births
1915 deaths
People from Galion, Ohio
People from St. Peter, Minnesota
Writers from Duluth, Minnesota
Military personnel from Minnesota
Minnesota Republicans
Minnesota sheriffs
State treasurers of Minnesota